Aziz Sağlam (also known as Saglam Azziz in Belgium) (born 6 August 1982) is a Turkish-Belgian futsal player.  He currently plays for BC Embourg and previously played for Onu Seraing and RP Ans.

He is a member of the Turkey national football team in the UEFA Futsal Championship.

References

1982 births
Living people
Belgian people of Turkish descent
Turkish men's futsal players